The Master Plan, completed and approved in 1994, set up the guidelines for the conservation and restoration of some 291 buildings identified as buildings to be preserved and restored.

Construction
In 1993, 291 buildings were identified as buildings to be preserved and restored. Mainly concentrated in the Etoile and Foch-Allenby districts, Saifi Village and Wadi Abu Jamil, the retained buildings were to be restored following the Master Plan guidelines. The Master Plan was completed and approved in 1994  by a decree emanating from the Council of Ministers. 
Retained buildings were divided into three categories: governmental and religious, buildings of heritage and architectural value (to be restored without external alteration) and ‘other category’ buildings (only limited alterations and additions were permitted). 
While buildings of heritage value had to be restored without external alteration, only limited alterations and additions were permitted for the ‘other category’ buildings.

History
In 1993, 291 buildings were identified as buildings to be preserved and restored out of nearly 900 buildings left standing after the war. Many of the surviving heritage buildings were in a hazardous and dilapidated state mainly due to small arms fire and subsequent deterioration. The main concentrations of retained buildings were in the Etoile and Foch-Allenby districts of Beirut’s historic core, Saifi Village and Wadi Abu Jamil. The Master Plan, completed and approved by a decree emanating from the Council of Ministers in March 1994, outlined the restoration of the retained buildings. Buildings identified for preservation were divided into three categories: governmental and religious, buildings of heritage and architectural value and ‘other category’ buildings. These were mainly modern structures in salvageable state.  Buildings of heritage value had to be restored without external alteration, while limited alterations and additions were permitted for ‘other category’ buildings. Considerable local stonemasonry skills were required to complete the restoration of these buildings, especially with regard to the hand-carving of decorative features, copied from surviving fragments.  An important aspect of restoration in the historic core was the parallel implementation of a pedestrian zone using basalt setts, salvaged from beneath existing streets, together with a unique vocabulary of street furniture. This included the re-creation of the original lighting poles and brackets designed for Beirut in the 1920s. This type of high quality restoration in a pedestrian setting makes Beirut’s Conservation Area a landmark historical district.

Timeline
1993:  Identification of 291 buildings as buildings to be preserved and restored.

1994: Completion and approval of the Master Plan by a decree emanating from the Council of Ministers, which outlined the restoration of the retained buildings.

See also

 Foch-Allenby district
 Saifi Village
 Wadi Abu Jamil
 Decree of Council of Ministers 1994
 Solidere
 Beirut Conservation Area
 Beirut conservation
 Beirut restoration
 Etoile Square
 Place de l'Etoile, Beirut
 Lebanese Civil War

References 
 
 

Buildings and structures in Beirut
Monuments and memorials in Lebanon
Squares in Beirut
Tourist attractions in Beirut